Yadkin may refer to:
 Yadkin County, North Carolina
 Yadkin River
 Yadkin Valley AVA